Papillon is a 1973 epic historical drama prison film directed by Franklin J. Schaffner. The screenplay by Dalton Trumbo and Lorenzo Semple Jr. was based on the 1969 autobiography by the French convict Henri Charrière. The film stars Steve McQueen as Charrière ("Papillon") and Dustin Hoffman as Louis Dega. Because it was filmed at remote locations, the film was quite expensive for the time ($12 million), but it earned more than twice that in its first year of release. The film's title is French for "Butterfly," referring to Charrière's tattoo and nickname.

Plot
Henri Charrière (Steve McQueen), is a safecracker nicknamed "Papillon" because of the butterfly tattoo on his chest. In 1933 France, he is "wrongly" convicted of murdering a pimp and is sentenced to life imprisonment within the penal system in French Guiana. En route, he meets a fellow convict, Louis Dega (Dustin Hoffman), an infamous forger and embezzler who is convinced that his wife will secure his release. Papillon offers to protect Dega if he will fund the former's escape once they reach Guiana. Enduring the horrors of life in a jungle labor camp, the two eventually become friends.

One day, Papillon defends Dega from a sadistic guard and escapes into the jungle, but is captured and sentenced to two years in solitary confinement. In gratitude, Dega has extra food smuggled to Papillon. When the smuggling is discovered, the warden screens Papillon's cell in darkness for six months and halves his rations, believing that it will force him to reveal his benefactor. Half-insane and reduced to eating insects to survive, Papillon refuses to give up Dega's name. He is eventually released and sent to the infirmary in St-Laurent-du-Maroni to recover.

Papillon sees Dega again and asks him to arrange for another escape attempt. Dega helps him meet an inmate doctor, who offers to secure him a boat on the outside with the help of a man named Pascal. Fellow prisoner Clusiot (Woodrow Parfrey) and a gay orderly named André Maturette (Robert Deman) join the escape plot. During the escape, Clusiot is knocked unconscious by a guard; Dega is forced to subdue the guard and reluctantly joins Papillon and Maturette, climbing the walls to the outside. Dega fractures his ankle in the fall. The trio meet Pascal and they escape into the night. In the jungle the next day, Pascal delivers the prisoners to their boat, but after he leaves the convicts discover that it is fake. They encounter a local trapper (John Quade) who has killed the bounty hunters that were waiting for them; he guides the three to a nearby leper colony, where they obtain supplies and a seaworthy boat.

The trio eventually land in Honduras and are accosted by a group of soldiers, who open fire and wound Maturette. He is captured along with Dega, while Papillon is forced to flee. Papillon evades the soldiers and lives for a long period with a native tribe; he awakens one morning to find them gone, leaving him with a small sack of pearls. Papillon pays a nun to take him to her convent where he asks the Mother Superior for refuge, but she instead turns him over to the authorities.

Papillon is brought back to French Guiana and sentenced to another five years of solitary confinement. He emerges a graying old man along with Maturette, whom he sees just before the latter dies. Papillon is then moved to the remote Devil's Island where he reunites with Dega, who has long given up all hope of being released. From a high cliff, Papillon observes a small cove where he discovers that the waves are powerful enough to carry a man out to sea and to the nearby mainland. Papillon urges Dega to join him in another escape, and the men make two floats out of bagged up coconuts. As they stand on the cliff side, Dega decides not to escape and begs Papillon not to either. Papillon embraces Dega a final time, and then leaps from the cliff. Grasping his float, he is successfully carried out to sea.

A narrator states that Papillon made it to freedom, and lived the rest of his life a free man, while the prison was eventually closed.

Cast

Production

After the publication of Papillon in 1969, a bidding war started between Avco-Embassy Pictures, Continental Distributing, Metro-Goldwyn-Mayer, and numerous French film companies for the film rights. Continental Distributing won the rights for $500,000 with the intent to hire Roman Polanski as director and Warren Beatty as lead actor, but the studio's funding fell through. It sold the rights to producer Robert Dorfmann, who initially intended to hire Terence Young as director and Charles Bronson as star before turning to Franklin J. Schaffner and Steve McQueen. The film's first screenplay by William Goldman, which was more faithful to the book than the final film, was rewritten by Lorenzo Semple Jr. to expand the role of Louis Dega in order to convince Dustin Hoffman to join the cast and eliminate depictions of homosexuality among prisoners. After Hoffman's casting Dalton Trumbo further rewrote the screenplay.

Papillon was filmed at various locations in Spain and Jamaica, with the cave scenes filmed beneath what is now the Xtabi hotel on the cliffs of Negril. The town scenes near the beginning of the film were shot in Hondarribia in Spain. The St-Laurent-du-Maroni penal colony scenes were actually filmed in Falmouth, Jamaica, and the swamp scenes were shot near Ferris Cross. Interior scenes were shot in Montego Bay while other scenes were filmed in Kingston, Ocho Rios, and Savanna-la-Mar. Most of the French prisoners on the island were portrayed by German-Jamaican extras. Steve McQueen’s famous cliff-jumping scene near the end of the film took place from the cliffs in Maui, Hawaii. McQueen insisted on performing the cliff-jumping stunt himself. He later said that it was "one of the most exhilarating experiences of my life."

McQueen was paid $2 million along with the contractual stipulation that he receive first billing over Dustin Hoffman. In addition, author Henri Charrière himself acted as consultant on location, apprising the filmmakers of the things he encountered during his years of imprisonment.

The Prison of St-Laurent-du-Maroni where Henri Charrière was held, and where most of the action takes place, was faithfully recreated using the original blueprints. Footage of the historic Prison in French Guiana plays under the end credits, which is shown to be abandoned and covered in jungle growth.

Soundtrack

The score to Papillon was composed and conducted by Jerry Goldsmith. It was recorded in Rome, Italy at the Ortophonic Recording Studio by the "Unione Musicisti Roma Orchestra". The film marked Goldsmith's fourth of seven collaborations with director Franklin J. Schaffner, following his Academy Award-nominated scores to Planet of the Apes (1968) and Patton (1970).  Both the director and composer shared the belief that film music should be used economically; they wanted the music as commentary only in sequences where it can emphasize the psychological aspects of the film. In Papillon, the film is two and a half hours long, but has 40 minutes with music.

Goldsmith's compositions, characterized by a late romantic symphonic and impressionistic style suffused with a metered, exotic timbre (using instruments from Caribbean folk music), are distributed mainly in the second half of the film. They generally accompany scenes outside the prison, during the various escape attempts by the protagonist. He used a delicate melodic approach, dominated by a very catchy theme expressed as a waltz, which was often played by an accordion. This instrument was associated with the French origin of the protagonists. The theme became famous with the popularity of the film, and it was released in many performance variations by different record companies.

The score was partially produced on vinyl in 1973 and reissued over the years. In the 21st century, an edition was produced on CD by Universal Records France. For the first time, this has the complete version of music from the film (it includes about five minutes of previously unreleased tracks). The DVD version of the English-language version of the film includes an option to listen to Goldsmith's music as an isolated audio track.

Goldsmith had his sixth Academy Award nomination for Best Original Score for this soundtrack. It was one of the American Film Institute's 250 nominated soundtracks for the top 25 American film scores.

Box office
The film was a commercial success and grossed $3,126,574 in its opening week. It earned theatrical rentals in the United States and Canada of $21.3 million.

Critical reception
Roger Ebert's review at the time of the film's original release was two-out-of-four stars; he said that the main flaw was a failure to gain audience interest in McQueen's and Hoffman's characters: "You know something has gone wrong when you want the hero to escape simply so that the movie can be over." Vincent Canby of The New York Times called the film "a big, brave, stouthearted, sometimes romantic, sometimes silly melodrama with the kind of visual sweep you don't often find in movies anymore." Arthur D. Murphy of Variety wrote, "For 150 uninterrupted minutes, the mood is one of despair, brutality, and little hope. On a professional level, the Allied Artists release is expert in all creative and technical areas. On an audience level, it is a relentless downer." Gene Siskel gave the film two-and-a-half stars out of four and called it "just plain boring." Kevin Thomas of the Los Angeles Times wrote, "'Papillon' is an eloquent tribute to the indomitability of the human spirit and a powerful indictment of those institutions dedicated only to breaking it. As such, it's lots easier to admire than to enjoy." Gary Arnold of The Washington Post called it "a keen disappointment ... this lumbering vehicle directed by Franklin J. Schaffner leaves Steve McQueen and Dustin Hoffman stranded on the screen while opportunities for vivid filmmaking and sympathetic characterizations are bungled at every turn." Richard Combs of The Monthly Film Bulletin wrote that "what is missing is any of the book's anger at the outrageous hypocrisy, injustice and inhumanity of the system; any of the passion which feeds Papillon's compulsion to escape."

Quentin Tarantino called it "a pretty iconic film for boys my age who saw it when it came out... The film is very involving. It contains maybe McQueen’s finest serious acting moment on film, when he sticks his head out of the solitary confinement door and is not only unrecognizable but completely deranged. And the film contains one of the most powerful time cuts I’ve ever seen in a motion picture. The film’s also not a little pretentious, self consciously arty, unrelentingly grim, extremely grueling and except for Dustin Hoffman keeping a bankroll and an extra pair of spectacles up his ass, completely devoid of any entertainment value."

Papillon holds a 77% rating on Rotten Tomatoes based on 30 reviews.

Awards and honors
In 1974, the film was nominated for an Oscar for Best Music, Original Dramatic Score (Jerry Goldsmith) and a Golden Globe Award for Best Motion Picture Actor, Drama (Steve McQueen).

In popular culture
The song "Devil's Island" by the American heavy metal band Megadeth, written by lead singer Dave Mustaine, was inspired by this film and appeared on the band's 1986 album Peace Sells... but Who's Buying?. Mustaine mentions this before playing the song during the band's Rude Awakening DVD. This song and mention can be found through a YouTube search of "Devil's Island Rude Awakening"

The song "Human Insecticide" by the Canadian thrash metal band Annihilator from their 1989 album Alice in Hell was inspired by this film.

The Editors song "Papillon", from their 2009 album In This Light and on This Evening, opens with the line 'Make our escape, you're my own papillon.'''

Mark Kozelek and Desertshore recorded a song called "Hey You Bastards I'm Still Here", named after Papillon’s last quote from the film, spoken in voice-over just before the closing credits start.

A parody of Papillon, Farfallon is a 1974 Italian comedy film directed by Riccardo Pazzaglia.

2017 film

Another film based on the autobiographies of Charrière and the 1973 film, also called Papillon'', was released in 2017, directed by Danish director Michael Noer. Charlie Hunnam played the lead role of Henri Charrière, while Rami Malek played Louis Dega. The film premiered at the Toronto International Film Festival in September 2017.

See also
 List of American films of 1973

References

External links

 
 
 

1973 films
1970s biographical drama films
1973 independent films
1970s prison drama films
American biographical drama films
American epic films
Historical epic films
American independent films
American prison drama films
Drama films based on actual events
Films based on non-fiction books
Films directed by Franklin J. Schaffner
Allied Artists films
Films with screenplays by Dalton Trumbo
Films scored by Jerry Goldsmith
Films produced by Robert Dorfmann
Films set in jungles
Films set in the 1930s
Films set in the 1940s
Films set on Devil's Island
Films shot in Hawaii
Films shot in Jamaica
Films shot in Spain
Films with screenplays by Lorenzo Semple Jr.
Films set in French Guiana
Films set in the French colonial empire
1973 drama films
1970s American films